The Intermunicipal League Doboj is a sixth level league in the Bosnia and Herzegovina football league system and a fifth level league in the Republika Srpska.

League champions
The league champions since 2010:

Member clubs for 2014–15
FK Zvijezda - Kakmuž
FK Hajduk - Kožuhe
FK Polet - Podnovlje
NK Željezničar - Pridjel Gornji
FK 27.Juli - Kalenderovci
OFK Zborište - Zborište
FK Borac - Kotorsko
FK Osinja 1975 - Osinja
FK Borac - Bosanski Lužani
FK 4.Juli - Pojezna
FK BSK - Bušletić
FK Vučijak - Majevac

Member clubs for 2015–16
FK Zadrugar - Sjekovac
FK Hajduk - Kožuhe
FK Polet - Podnovlje
NK Željezničar - Pridjel Gornji
FK 27.Juli - Kalenderovci
OFK Zborište - Zborište
FK Borac - Kotorsko
FK Osinja 1975 - Osinja
FK Borac - Bosanski Lužani
FK 4.Juli - Pojezna
FK BSK - Bušletić
FK Vučijak - Majevac
FK Radnički - Brodsko Polje

Member clubs for 2016–17
FK Zadrugar - Sjekovac
FK Ozrenski Sokolovi - Boljanić
FK Polet - Podnovlje
NK Željezničar - Pridjel Gornji
FK 27.Juli - Kalenderovci
OFK Zborište - Zborište
FK Borac - Kotorsko
FK Borac - Bosanski Lužani
FK 4.Juli - Pojezna
FK BSK - Bušletić
FK Vučijak - Majevac
FK Radnički - Brodsko Polje

Member clubs for 2017–18
FK Zadrugar - Sjekovac
FK Ozrenski Sokolovi - Boljanić
FK Polet - Podnovlje
NK Željezničar - Pridjel Gornji
FK 27.Juli - Kalenderovci
OFK Zborište - Zborište
FK Borac - Kotorsko
FK 4.Juli - Pojezna
FK BSK - Bušletić
FK Radnički - Brodsko Polje

Member clubs for 2018–19
FK Zadrugar - Sjekovac
FK Ozrenski Sokolovi - Boljanić
FK Polet - Podnovlje
NK Željezničar - Pridjel Gornji
FK 27.Juli - Kalenderovci
OFK Zborište - Zborište
FK Liješće - Liješće
FK 4.Juli - Pojezna
FK Radnički - Brodsko Polje

References

6
5
Bos